Solitary vireo may refer to:

 Cassin's vireo, Vireo cassinii, endemic west of the Rocky Mountains from southwestern Canada to California, United States
 Plumbeous vireo, Vireo plumbeus, endemic east of the Rocky Mountains from southwestern Montana, United States to western Mexico
 Blue-headed vireo, Vireo solitarius proper, endemic to Canada east of the Rocky Mountains to northeastern United States